Avispa (or Avispa Music per the URL) is a record label from Spain specializing in heavy metal; it is the largest Spanish company specializing in this type of music. When it was new, it was limited to the Spanish market, but it later launched itself internationally.

Some artists 
 Absolute
 Adagio
 Angra
 Arkania
 Avantasia
 Avatar
 Axxis
 Barón Rojo
 Breaker
 Cruachan
 Darna
 Dragonfly
 Edguy
 Europe
 Kotipelto
 Masterplan
 Pyramaze
 Rata Blanca
 Rob Rock
 Saratoga
 Sauze
 Silver Fist
 Stravaganzza
 Theatre Of Tragedy
 U.D.O.
 WarCry
 White Skull
 Wereworld

See also 
 List of record labels

External links
 Avispa's Official Website

Spanish record labels
IFPI members